John William Scarbrough (October 20, 1885 – March 3, 1960) was a college football player.

Early years
John William Scarbrough was born on October 20, 1885 in Rockdale, Texas to Eugene Monroe Scarbrough and Ada Ledbetter.

Sewanee
Scarbrough was an All-Southern quarterback for the Sewanee Tigers of Sewanee: The University of the South, and captain of its team in 1905. On the dedication of Harris Stadium, one writer noted "The University of the South has numbered among its athletes some of the greatest. Anyone who played against giant Henry Phillips in 1901-1903 felt that he was nothing less than the best as guard and fullback.  Anyone who ever saw a punt from the foot of J. W. Scarbrough." He scored the Tigers' only points in the 68 to 4 loss to Vanderbilt.

References

1885 births
1960 deaths
American football quarterbacks
American football punters
Sewanee Tigers football players
Players of American football from Texas
People from Rockdale, Texas
All-Southern college football players